Life and Times is the fourth studio album by American singer-songwriter Jim Croce, released in July 1973. The album contains the No. 1 Billboard chart hit "Bad, Bad Leroy Brown". Croce was nominated for two 1973 Grammy awards in the "Pop Male Vocalist" and "Record of the Year" categories for the song "Bad, Bad Leroy Brown". It was Croce's final album to be released during his lifetime.

Production
The album was produced by Tommy West and Terry Cashman.

Critical reception
The New Rolling Stone Record Guide wrote: "Croce's nostalgic side began to take over and he started to produce strikingly impersonal experiments in the craft of sentiment. It fits him well."

Track listing

Personnel
Jim Croce – rhythm guitar, vocals
Kenny Ascher – organ on "A Good Time Man Like Me Ain't Got No Business (Singin' the Blues)"
Terry Cashman – backing vocals
Gary Chester – drums
Ellie Greenwich – backing vocals
Michael Kamen – oboe on "Next Time, This Time"
David Spinozza – electric guitar on "Roller Derby Queen" and "Alabama Rain"
Joe Macho – bass
Maury Muehleisen – acoustic guitar, backing vocals
Alan Rolnick – electric guitar on "One Less Set of Footsteps"
Tasha Thomas – backing vocals
Eric Weissberg – fiddle on "Careful Man"
Tommy West – bass, piano, backing vocals
Willie "Slim" McCoy – backing vocals on "Bad, Bad Leroy Brown"
Peter Dino – string arrangement on "These Dreams"

Production
Producers: Terry Cashman, Tommy West
Engineer: Bruce Tergesen

Chart positions

Singles

Certifications

References

1973 albums
Jim Croce albums
albums produced by Terry Cashman
ABC Records albums
Vertigo Records albums